Platonists are followers of Platonism, the philosophy of Plato. Platonism can be said to have begun when Plato founded his academy c. 385 BC. Ancient Platonism went on to last until the end of the last remaining pagan school of Platonism in Alexandria which was brought on by the Muslim conquest of Egypt in 641, over a thousand years after the opening of the first Platonic school. Platonism had an immense impact on the intellectual life of the ancient world eventually becoming the dominant philosophy of late antiquity.

See also
List of ancient Greek philosophers
List of Cynic philosophers
List of Epicurean philosophers
List of Stoic philosophers

 
Platonists
Ancient Platonists